The Slessor Glacier is a glacier at least 140 km (75 nmi) long and 90 km (50 nmi) wide, flowing west into the Filchner Ice Shelf to the north of the Shackleton Range. First seen from the air and mapped by the Commonwealth Trans-Antarctic Expedition (CTAE) in 1956. Named by the CTAE for RAF Marshal Sir John Slessor, chairman of the expedition committee.

See also
 Ice stream
 List of glaciers in the Antarctic
 List of Antarctic ice streams
 Glaciology

References

Glaciers of Coats Land
Filchner-Ronne Ice Shelf